Ioana Muresan  (born ) is a retired Romanian volleyball player. She was part of the Romania women's national volleyball team.

She participated at the 1994 FIVB Volleyball Women's World Championship in Brazil. On club level she played with Petrodava Piatra Neamt.

Clubs
 Petrodava Piatra Neamt (1994)

References

1971 births
Living people
Romanian women's volleyball players
Place of birth missing (living people)